Cornufer cheesmanae is a species of frog in the family Ceratobatrachidae. It is endemic to New Guinea and found in the Cyclops Mountains (Papua, Indonesia) and Bewani Mountains (Papua New Guinea). The specific name cheesmanae honors Lucy Evelyn Cheesman, an English entomologist, explorer, and curator at London Zoo. Common name Cheesman's wrinkled ground frog has been coined for it.

Description
It is morphologically similar to Cornufer wuenscheorum, but is even smaller. The first finger is shorter than second one. The inner metatarsal tubercle is relatively shorter in Cornufer cheesmanae. The male advertisement call consists of a single note, instead of double notes as in Cornufer wuenscheorum. The dominant frequency is about 3300 Hz. Call series can last tens of seconds, during which the emission rate increases.

Habitat and conservation
Little is known about this inhabitant of hilly tropical rainforests. The eggs are laid on the ground and development is direct, without free-living tadpole stage.

The threats to Cornufer cheesmanae are unknown. Its range includes Cyclops Mountains Nature Reserve, but fires and illegal removal of vegetation are encroaching on this habitat.

References

cheesmanae
Amphibians of Western New Guinea
Amphibians of Papua New Guinea
Taxa named by Hampton Wildman Parker
Amphibians described in 1940
Taxonomy articles created by Polbot
Endemic fauna of New Guinea